The Bourbon & Beefsteak, latterly The Bourbon, is a pub in Kings Cross, Sydney, Australia. It was opened in October 1967 by Bernie Houghton with a 24-hour licence. At the time Kings Cross was a popular venue for United States G.I.s on rest and recreation leave from the Vietnam War. In 1999 it gained national attention after Australian cricket player Ricky Ponting was involved in a fight outside the pub. In 2019 it was sold for mixed-use development.

References

Kings Cross, New South Wales
Pubs in Sydney
Hotels established in 1967
1967 establishments in Australia